The Ford Atlas is a concept pickup truck designed by Ford.  Unveiled by the company at the 2013 North American International Auto Show, the Atlas was developed as a close preview of the 2015 Ford F-150.   Along with showcasing the transition of the model line to aluminum-intensive construction, the concept vehicle also included additional features to further enhance fuel economy.    Though sized similar to a 2013 Ford F-150 SuperCrew, the aluminum construction of the Atlas saves approximately 700 pounds over its steel-bodied counterpart (no official curb weight for the Atlas is given).

In addition to design elements developed to enhance fuel economy (including unprecedented active wheel shutters), the Atlas was also designed with enhanced capability and ease of use.

Overview

Chassis 
Alongside the introduction of aluminum-intensive construction for the production F-Series, the Atlas debuted the second generation of the Ford 3.5L twin-turbocharged EcoBoost V6 engine.  While unchanged in displacement or in the use of turbocharging, the updated engine is primarily distinguished by the introduction of start-stop capability to reduce idling.

Exterior 
Styled as a sharper-edged evolution of the 2009 F-150, the Atlas was fitted with quad LED headlamps and taillamps.  Alongside active grille and bumper air dam aerodynamics, the tailgate was fitted with a decklid spoiler.  Introducing a redesign of a rear tailgate step, the cargo bed of the Atlas also included a set of hidden cargo ramps for wheeling items into the bed.

Interior 

Configured with a 5-passenger interior, the Atlas was fitted with leather seats.  To improve driving in small spaces, the Atlas was fitted with a 360-degree camera, giving a "birds' eye view" of the vehicle.  As a truck version of its Active Park Assist parking feature, the Atlas debuted Trailer Backup Assist, allowing drivers to back up a trailer with the turn of a knob; Dynamic Hitch Assist uses the backup camera to line up the trailer hitch to a trailer.

See also 
Ford F-Series

References 

Atlas
Atlas
Ford F-Series